The Salem Witches were a baseball team of the New England League, a minor league in American major league baseball. The team played a total of five non-consecutive seasons using the "Witches" moniker. Salem also hosted the New England League Salem Fairies (1887) and Salem (1891–1892), as well as Salem of the New England Association (1895). Salem first had a team in the 1884 Massachusetts State Association.

Location: Lowell, Massachusetts; Salem, Massachusetts
League: New England League 1888, 1926-1928, 1930
Ballpark: Alumni Field, Donovan Park

Year-by-year record

Rosters
Empty boxes indicate unknown values.

1926 season

1927 season

1928 season 

In later seasons, the rosters were unrecorded.

Statistics

1926 season

Pitching

Batting

1927 season

Pitching

Batting

1928 season

Pitching

Batting

References

Defunct minor league baseball teams
Defunct baseball teams in Massachusetts
New England League teams
Baseball teams disestablished in 1930
Baseball teams established in 1888
Boston Red Sox minor league affiliates
Massachusetts State Association teams